Stephen McBroom (born 1 April 1964) is  a former Australian rules footballer who played with South Melbourne Sydney in the Victorian Football League (VFL) He has two kids, his daughter Ashley McBroom born 2005 and his son Riley McBroom born in 2007.

Notes

External links 		
		
		
		
		
		
		
Living people		
1964 births		
		
Australian rules footballers from Victoria (Australia)		
Sydney Swans players